The Royal Norwegian Ministry of Industrial Provisioning was a Norwegian ministry that existed from 1917 to 1922.

It was established on 26 August 1916, during the first World War. It ceased to exist on 31 October 1922. Its tasks were mainly transferred to the Ministries of Social Affairs and Agriculture.

The heads of the Ministry of Provisioning were: Oddmund Jacobsøn Vik (1916-1917), Birger Stuevold-Hansen (1917-1919), Haakon Martin Five (1919-1920), Johan Henrik Rye Holmboe (1920-1921), Ole Monsen Mjelde (1921) and Rasmus Olai Mortensen (1921-1922).

An unrelated Ministry of Provisioning was formed in 1939. This later changed its name to the Ministry of Provisioning and Reconstruction.

References

Provisioning
1916 establishments in Norway
1922 disestablishments in Europe
Ministries established in 1916